Harthope Moss, also known as Chapel Fell (elevation ) is a mountain pass in the English Pennines. The pass divides Weardale to the north and Teesdale to the south. The unclassified road over the pass connects the A689 at St John's Chapel, County Durham with the B6277 near Langdon Beck in Upper Teesdale, County Durham. It is the equal highest paved pass in England with the Killhope Cross on the A689, approximately 10 miles to the north on the other side of Burnhope Seat.

See also
 List of highest paved roads in Europe
 List of mountain passes

External links
 Profile on climbbybike.com

Mountain passes of England
Stanhope, County Durham